Tang Bik-wan (27 September 1924 – 25 March 1991) was a former Chinese actress and a Cantonese opera singer from Hong Kong. Tang is credited with over 280 films.

Early life
On 27 September 1924, Tang was born as Tang Cheuk Fu.

Tang Bik Wan was a Cantonese opera actress since she was 13 when she joined a Cantonese opera. She was a disciple of a few Cantonese opera masters and soon became the head actress for her troupe when she was 15. She was very talented and could almost play any role in the opera; hence, earning her the nickname the "multi-role actress". During the civil war, she went to Guangzhou, and then later to Hong Kong.

Career
In 1950, Tang crossed over as an actress in Hong Kong films. Tang and seven great opera actresses later became sworn sisters who went by the nickname "Eight Peonies". Tang was the Blue Peony and until 1967. Tang is credited with over 280 films.

By 1968, Tang became a TV actress, performing in Rediffusion, ATV and TVB. As age caught up with her, she became the typical actress for the role as the mother of the drama's main characters, some of her most notable roles on television including the 1977 family soap opera A House Is Not a Home, 1978 classic drama "Chameleon", and popular 1979 drama serial "The Good, The Bad and The Ugly". Tang's television career reached its peak when she played the caring and intelligent family matriarch in the late 1980s long-running hit The Seasons (hence, gaining her the nickname "Ma-Da" [Cantonese pronunciation of "mother"]). "Ma-Da" propelled her to fame, and when she continued to take movies and advertisements, she would portray the "Ma-Da" role.

Filmography

Films 
This is a partial list of films.
 1950 Ciyun's Farewell in Storm and Fire (Part 1)
 1950 Ciyun's Farewell in Storm and Fire (Part 2)	 	 
 1950 The Gardener's Daughter - To Sheung-Yuet
 1956 Lady with a Silver and Bitter Tongue
 1960 Fortune.
 1960 Lady Racketeer.
 1960 The Love Quadrangle
 1964 Pigeon Cage (aka The Apartment of 14 Families)

Awards 
 Star. Avenue of Stars. Tsim Sha Tsui waterfront in Hong Kong.

Personal life 
Tang's health began to deteriorate during her tenure in The Seasons as a result of throat cancer. Her voice on screen had been noticeably deeper and softer between two seasons of the television series after she had undergone treatment for it during the off-season hiatus. However, Tang Pik Wan, the multi-talented actress died of a liver malfunction on March 25, 1991. Her family in her name has donated to various charity organizations in Hong Kong.  There is a nursery and an old folks centre named after her.

Gallery

References

External links
 Film Archive's "Morning Matinee" series to revisit allure of "Versatile Opera Queen" Tang Bik-wan (with photos). Some of the films will be accompanied by post-screening talks hosted by Tang's daughter Helen Lui Oi-yin,...
 
  
 HK Cinemagic entry

Hong Kong Cantonese opera actresses
1924 births
1991 deaths
Hong Kong film actresses
People from Sanshui District
Hong Kong television actresses
Actresses from Guangdong
20th-century Hong Kong actresses
20th-century Hong Kong women singers
Chinese film actresses
Chinese television actresses
20th-century Chinese actresses
Singers from Guangdong